Ather Energy is an Indian electric vehicle company, headquartered in Bangalore. It was founded by Tarun Mehta and Swapnil Jain in 2013. It manufactures two electric scooters - the Ather 450X and the Ather 450 Plus. It has also established electric vehicle charging infrastructure across the country called Ather Grid.

History

Ather Energy was founded in 2013 by Tarun Mehta and Swapnil Jain. In early 2014, it received  from the Technology Development Board under Department of Science and Technology, IIT Madras and Srini V Srinivasan, IIT alumnus and founder of Aerospike. In December 2014, Flipkart founders, Sachin Bansal and Binny Bansal invested $1 million as the seed capital. In May 2015, it received $12 million from Tiger Global for investments in development, testing, production and the launch of the vehicle. 

On 23 February 2016, the company unveiled its first scooter S340 at a technology conference Surge in Bengaluru. Hero MotoCorp invested  in the Series B round of funding in October 2016.

In May 2019, Ather Energy raised $51 million in another round of funding, led by Sachin Bansal's investment of $32 million. Hero MotoCorp converted its convertible debt of $19 million as a part of this round. In addition to this, InnoVen Capital extended an $8 million venture debt.

In December 2019, Ather Energy signed a MoU with Government of Tamil Nadu to set up a  manufacturing plant for electrical vehicles in Hosur.

The company added two new products to its portfolio, the Ather 450X and the Ather 450 Plus in January 2020. 

In July 2020, Ather Energy raised $11.4 million from Hero MotoCorp, as a part of its Series C round funding.

Production and infrastructure 
Ather Energy began operations at its production facility in Hosur, Tamil Nadu, on 2 January 2021. The new Ather factory has an annual capacity of 1,10,000 scooters and 1,20,000 battery packs. The company currently has a presence in 27 cities across 15 states.

Ather Energy also establishes Ather Grid, an electric vehicle charging infrastructure in cities it is present in. The company has set up over 1000+ fast charging points in 23 cities across India as of February 2023.

Products

Ather 450x (Gen 3.1) 
Launched on 7th January 2023
The Ather 450X and Ather 450 Plus are now available in four new colors: Salt Green, Lunar Grey, True Red, and Cosmic Black. These colors have been added to the existing color options of Space Grey and White. The mint green color option has been replaced by Salt Green.
In addition to the new color options,

Ather Energy has also introduced the Ather Stack 5.0 software with improved graphics. The software includes features such as Wings of Power, Google Vector Maps, and Auto Hold. However, Auto Hold is only available for the Gen 3 and Gen 3.1 models. The Gen 2 model does not support this feature due to different motor controller.

Overall, the Ather 450X Gen 3.1 is a stylish and high-performance electric scooter with several notable improvements over its predecessor, including new color options and upgraded software. The scooter has received positive reviews for its performance and features, making it a popular choice among electric scooter enthusiasts in India.

Ather 450X (3rd Generation) 
Ather 450X (3rd Generation) was launched on 19th July 2022 with improved range and other features. This new scooter is 6k more expensive then Ather 450x.
This new 3rd generation Ather 450x has more powerful battery with 3.66 kWh.

Ather 450X

Ather 450X has a 4G sim card and Wifi along with Bluetooth connectivity and the new 7” touchscreen dashboard, comes with a color depth of 16M and a Snapdragon Quad Core processor. Ather 450X utilises Android Open Source to offer map navigation, On-board diagnostics and features like Over-the-air updates, Auto Indicator off and Guide-me-home lights.

The Ather mobile app offers personalised ride statistics, charging status, push navigation and more functionalities like theft & tow detection, live location & vehicle state tracking, voice assistant and welcome lights. Ather 450X supports connected accessories like smart helmets and tyre pressure monitoring systems (TPMS).

Ather 450

The Ather 450 is constructed using an all-aluminium frame, comes with a 3.3 kW / 5.4 kW peak (7.2 BHP) Brushless DC electric motor, and a 2.4 kWh lithium-ion battery pack. The scooter can accelerate to 40 km/h in 3.9 seconds, attain a top speed of 80 km/h, and can travel 75 km on one charge in city-riding conditions (107 km in the Indian driving cycle).

Ather Energy also offers an upgraded version of Ather 450 called the Ather 450 Plus which has a top speed of 70 kmph and a True Range of 70 km in Eco mode. The Ather 450 Plus offers 4G connectivity, onboard navigation, and other connected features but does not have Bluetooth connectivity or the Warp mode.

Other services

OTA updates
Ather Energy provides over-the-air (OTA) updates for its electric scooters. Ather Energy has rolled out 13 OTA updates till date.

Ather Grid

Ather has set up its own charging network, dubbed Ather Grid, in 18 cities across India. These DC-fast-charging stations use Ather's proprietary charging method and connector to charge the Ather scooters at a rate of 1 km/min. The charging points are also equipped with a 3-pin socket to supply AC power to other electric vehicles that do not use Ather's connector. Other vehicles can connect to the charging point and start charging using the Ather Grid app for iOS and Android.

More than 120 fast charging grid points are installed across 18 Cities in India. Ather has plans to set up around 300 fast charging stations across India by end of 2021. Ather also sets up a home charging point at customer's homes which will charge the Ather 450X overnight.

Ather Space
Ather Energy owns and operates its own Experience Centres. Ather currently has 55 experience centers in 46+ cities in India.

See also 

 Gogoro
 Hero MotoCorp
 Okinawa Autotech
 Ola Electric
 Battery electric vehicle
 Plug-in electric vehicle
 List of modern production plug-in electric vehicles

References 

How to Charge Ather 450x at Home EVsInsider.

External links
 

Electric vehicle infrastructure developers
Manufacturing companies based in Bangalore
Electric vehicle battery manufacturers
Electric vehicle manufacturers of India
Battery electric vehicle manufacturers
2013 establishments in Karnataka
Vehicle manufacturing companies established in 2013
Scooter manufacturers
Electric scooters
Electric vehicle industry